Vasiliko is a Greek toponym, meaning "royal place/land". It can refer to:

Vasiliko, Achaea, a village in Achaea
Vasiliko, Euboea, a village in Euboea
Vasiliko, Ioannina, a village in the Ioannina regional unit
Vasiliko, Messenia, a village in Messenia
a village on the site of the ancient city Sicyon, in Corinthia

See also
 Vasilika (disambiguation)
 Vasiliki (disambiguation)